Battle taxi may refer to

 Battle Taxi, a 1955 American drama film
 "Battle taxi," a colloquial name for an armoured personnel carrier